The 1997–98 season was Reading's 127th year in existence and fourth consecutive season in the First Division, and covered the period from 1 July 1997 to 30 June 1998. Reading finished the season in 24th position, resulting in relegation back to the Second Division. In the Football League Cup, Reading were knocked out by Middlesbrough at the Fifth Round stage, whilst in the FA Cup, Sheffield United knocked Reading out at the Fifth Round stage.

Season events
Reading started the season under new manager Terry Bullivant, with Bullivant resigning on 18 March 1998. Alan Pardew was appointed caretaker-manager for seven days before Tommy Burns was appointed as the club's new manager on 26 March 2008.

Squad

Out on loan

Left club during season

Transfers

In

Loan in

Out

Loan out

Released

Results

First Division

Results

Table

FA Cup

League Cup

Squad statistics

Appearances and goals

|-
|colspan="14"|Players away on loan:

|-
|colspan="14"|Players who appeared for Reading but left during the season:

|}

Goal scorers

Clean sheets

Disciplinary record

Notes

References

Soccerbase.com

Reading F.C. seasons
Reading